"Just" is a single by the English alternative rock band Radiohead, released on 7 August 1995. It is the seventh track on their second album, The Bends (1995). In 2007, NME named "Just" 34th on its list of the "Greatest Indie Anthems Ever". In 2008, it was included in Radiohead: The Best Of. The English producer Mark Ronson released a cover version in February 2008, the fourth single from his album Version.

Writing
Much of "Just" was written by guitarist Jonny Greenwood, who, according to singer Thom Yorke, "was trying to get as many chords as he could into a song". The angular guitar riff was influenced by John McGeoch's playing on the Magazine song "Shot By Both Sides"; Greenwood said that it was "pretty much the same kind of idea".

Music video
The "Just" music video was directed by Jamie Thraves, who adapted it from an idea he had for a short film. The video took two days to shoot; the street scenes were filmed on Liverpool Street, London, and the scenes of the band on a set.

In the video, a man lies in the middle of the pavement, attracting attention from passersby. The members of Radiohead watch from an apartment above. The man's conversation with passersby is displayed in subtitles; they ask why he is lying down, but he refuses to explain. Eventually, the man explains, but his explanation is not subtitled. The bystanders lie down next to him.

Track listing

CD 1
"Just" – 3:54
"Planet Telex" (Karma Sunra mix) – 5:23 (remix by U.N.K.L.E.)
"Killer Cars" (Mogadon version) – 3:50 (remix by John Leckie)

CD 2
"Just" – 3:54
"Bones" (Live) – 3:14
"Planet Telex" (Live) – 4:07
"Anyone Can Play Guitar" (Live) – 3:40

Personnel
Thom Yorke – vocals, electric and acoustic guitars
Jonny Greenwood – electric guitar, Hammond organ
Ed O'Brien – electric guitar
Colin Greenwood – bass
Philip Selway – drums

Charts

Certifications

Mark Ronson version

Musicians Mark Ronson and Alex Greenwald covered "Just" for the Radiohead tribute album Exit Music: Songs with Radio Heads. It was released digitally on 13 March 2006 as the lead single.

Track listing

Charts

2008 re-release

Ronson re-released his cover in February 2008, as the fourth single from his second album, Version. The song had been released earlier under the tribute album Exit Music: Songs with Radio Heads (a Radiohead album tribute) but was never given much promotion by the label. The song quickly gained airplay, being featured in BBC Radio 1's "A-List".

Chart performance
The song played as the follow-up to "Valerie", which was still in the UK top 20 upon the release of "Just". "Just" reached No. 31 after its release.

Music videos
A music video was made for the song. Directed by Jim Canty, it acted as a sequel to and paid homage to the earlier Radiohead video. The video features a city sweeper finding the group people lying around on ground.

Track listing

CD Single 
 "Just" (radio edit)
 "Valerie" (SugaRush Beat Company remix)

CD 1 88697271202 / download 
 "Just" (radio edit) – 3:51
 "Valerie" (SugaRush Beat Company remix) – 3:45

CD 2 88697272032 / download 
 "Just" (radio edit) – 3:15
 "Just" (DJ Premier's Justremixitmix) (featuring Blaq Poet) – 3:57
 "Just" (The Go! Team remix) – 2:31
 "Just" (The Loving Hand remix) – 6:12
 "Just" (DJ Premier's Justremixitmix) (featuring Blaq Poet) (instrumental) – 3:57
 "Just" (The Loving Hand remix) (instrumental) – 6:12

10" vinyl 88697271211 
 "Just" (radio edit)"
 "Just" (DJ Premier's Justremixitmix) (featuring Blaq Poet)
 "Just" (The Loving Hand remix)
 "Just" (The Go! Team remix)

Charts

References

External links

1995 singles
2006 singles
2008 singles
Mark Ronson songs
Parlophone singles
Radiohead songs
Song recordings produced by Mark Ronson
EMI Records singles
RCA Records singles
Songs written by Thom Yorke
Songs written by Colin Greenwood
Songs written by Jonny Greenwood
Songs written by Philip Selway
Songs written by Ed O'Brien
Song recordings produced by John Leckie
Phantom Planet songs
1995 songs